Royal Prussian Jagdstaffel 66, commonly abbreviated to Jasta 66, was a "hunting group" (i.e., fighter squadron) of the Luftstreitkräfte,  the air arm of the Imperial German Army during World War I. The squadron would score over 97 aerial victories during the war, including seven observation balloons downed. The unit's victories came at the expense of five pilots killed in action, one who died in captivity, and two taken prisoner of war.

History
Jasta 66 was founded on 27 January 1918 at Hannover, Germany, at Fliegerersatz-Abteilung ("Replacement Detachment") 5. The new squadron became operational on 5 February. On 12 February 1918, it was attached to 7 Armee. Rudolf Windisch scored the unit's first victory on 15 March 1918. Jasta 66 would serve 7 Armee until the war's end.

Commanding officers (Staffelführer)
 Rudolf Windisch: 27 January 1918 – 27 May 1918
 Wilhelm Schulz: 27 May 1918 – 25 June 1918
 Lambert Schutt: c. 27 May 1918 – 15 July 1918
 Konrad Schwartz: c. 15 July 1918 – 18 July 1918
 Arthur Laumann: c. 18 July 1918 – 11 August 1918
 Kurt-Bertram von Döring: 11 August 1918 – 24 August 1918
 Bruno von Voight: 24 August 1918 – 19 September 1918
 Werner Preuss: 19 September 1918 – war's end

Duty stations
 Saint-Gobert, France: 12 February 1918
 Norman-le-Wast: 5 March 1918
 Perles, France: 20 July 1918
 Sissonne, France: 30 July 1918
 Boncourt, France: 21 August 1918
 Plomion, France: 9 October 1918
 Bourlers: 4 November 1918
 Sarienne-les-Longue

References

Bibliography
 

66
Military units and formations established in 1918
1918 establishments in Germany
Military units and formations disestablished in 1918